Le Chalard is a commune in the Haute-Vienne department in the Nouvelle-Aquitaine region in western France.

Inhabitants are known as Peyrouliers.

See also
Communes of the Haute-Vienne department

Culture
Festival 1001 Notes, music festival

References

External links
blog Le Chalard

Communes of Haute-Vienne